Dermontti Farra Dawson (born June 17, 1965) is an American former professional football player who was a center and long snapper in the National Football League (NFL). He played college football with the Kentucky Wildcats. He was drafted by the Pittsburgh Steelers in the second round of the 1988 NFL Draft and spent his entire pro career with the team and was elected to the Pro Football Hall of Fame in 2012.

Early life
Dawson was born in Lexington, Kentucky where he attended Bryan Station High School. He was a nationally ranked high school track and field performer in the discus and shot put.

After having a bad experience playing ninth grade football, Dawson chose not to go out for his high school team his sophomore year. He joined the football team as a junior after being recruited due to his size by the school's football coach. He was an all-state offensive tackle in high school and eventually accepted a football scholarship to attend the University of Kentucky. Among his high school teammates were future NFL players Marc Logan and Cornell Burbage.

College football

Dawson played center and guard at Kentucky. He lettered in each of his four years. In his freshman year in 1984 the team defeated Wisconsin in the Hall of Fame Bowl. As a senior in 1987 Dawson was named second-team All-Southeastern Conference (SEC).

Professional career

Dawson was selected by the Pittsburgh Steelers in the second round of the 1988 NFL Draft. In his rookie season he played guard alongside Hall of Fame center Mike Webster. When Webster left the team following that season, Dawson succeeded him as the starting center. He soon became one of the more respected players among the Steelers, and one of the best in the league at his position. He earned the name "Dirt" for the way he would try to grind defenders into the ground. In contrast, his friendly off-field demeanor led to a second nickname, Ned Flanders, after the annoyingly cheerful character from The Simpsons.

Dawson was named to seven consecutive Pro Bowls from 1992 to 1998 and was a six-time AP First-team All-Pro. In 1993, he was named co-AFC Offensive Lineman of the Year by the NFLPA and in 1996 he was named the NFL Alumni's Offensive Lineman of the Year. He played in 170 consecutive games, the second-most in Steelers history, until severe hamstring injuries forced him to sit out nine games in 1999 and seven more games in 2000.  Dawson was released by the Steelers following the 2000 season partly due to these injuries and partly due to salary cap reasons. He opted to retire rather than trying to play for another team.

He is the only player to have played in the two most lopsided games in the Browns–Steelers rivalry, getting his first career start at center in the Steelers' 51–0 loss to the Cleveland Browns at home (still the worst loss for the Steelers in franchise history), but was victorious in the Steelers 43–0 win against the Browns in Cleveland ten years later, in the Browns' first game in four years.

Personal life
Dawson is divorced from Regina – who served as an elementary school principal at Shearer Elementary in nearby Winchester, Kentucky – and has two children. He returned to Lexington after his retirement, where he spent several years as a real estate developer. He filed for Chapter 7 bankruptcy protection in 2010 listing over $69 million in liabilities against just under $1.5 million in assets. He currently resides in San Diego, California, where he is a sales executive for a promotional products company.

He is also a part owner of the Washington Wild Things, an independent league baseball team in Washington, Pennsylvania.

Legacy
Dawson was named the first-team center on the National Football League 1990s All-Decade Team. In 2007, he was selected for the Pittsburgh Steelers All-Time Team which was named as part of the franchise's 75th season celebration. The Steelers have not reissued Dawson’s #63 Jersey since his retirement, though it has not been formally retired. His election to the Pro Football Hall of Fame in 2012 was preceded by three consecutive times of being a finalist listed for the honor.

In 2001 Dawson and his wife established the Dermontti F. and Regina M. Dawson Endowed Graduate Fellowship in Education scholarship at his alma mater, the University of Kentucky (UK). Dawson was appointed to the school's board of trustees by Kentucky governor Ernie Fletcher in 2005. He is a member of UK's College of Education's "Alumni Hall of Fame" and the UK Hall of Distinguished Alumni as well as a charter member of the UK Athletics Hall of Fame. In addition, his jersey has been retired by the school.

References

1965 births
Living people
Players of American football from Lexington, Kentucky
American football offensive guards
American football centers
Bryan Station High School alumni
Kentucky Wildcats football players
Pittsburgh Steelers players
Pro Football Hall of Fame inductees
American Conference Pro Bowl players
Ed Block Courage Award recipients